Smaranda Brăescu (21 May 1897 – 2 February 1948) was a Romanian parachuting and aviation pioneer, former multiple world record holder. Her achievements earned her the nickname "Queen of the Heights".

In the late 1920s and early 1930s she achieved several notable records, becoming the first Romanian woman to hold a parachuting license, the first European woman to be granted an American pilot license and the women's record holder for highest parachute jump.

These feats made her a popular heroine both in Romania and abroad, a status that was further confirmed by her participation as part of a White Squadron medical wing in several battles of World War II. Opposition to the newly-installed communist regime lead to her being sent to prison in 1946, where she most likely died two years later.

Biography

Early life
She was born in the village of Hânțești, Buciumeni commune, in the present-day Galați County. After World War I she worked as a substitute teacher in her native village.

Career
In 1918, she flew for the first time in a Farman plane piloted by Captain Dumitru Naidinescu. In 1928, while in Germany, she bought a parachute, and jumped for the first time from a  height, becoming the first female Romanian parachutist.

She obtained her parachuting license on 5 July 1928, while traveling to Berlin, after a two days course and a jump without incidents. She became the first Romanian woman to ever obtain a parachuting license and one of the first women in the world to do so. This feat made Romania the third country in the world with a female parachutist.

In 1930, after a jump near Satu Mare, she was seriously injured and remained bedridden for six months. On 2 October 1931, Brăescu set the women's world record for highest parachute jump (from around 6,000 meters or 20,700 feet), landing in the Bărăgan Plain, Romania.

In 1932, in her Miles Hawk, she established the record crossing the Mediterranean Sea between Rome and Tripoli –  in 6 hours and 10 minutes.

On 19 May 1932, she set the absolute world record for highest parachute jump, in Sacramento, California. It was homologated by the Aero Club of Washington. Sources disagree on the exact height of her jump, but it is usually given at somewhere around 7000 meters. From then on, she becomes a heroine, being escorted by 30 other planes to an air show in Canada, where she is invited. Later that year, Brăescu obtained her private pilot's license in the United States, becoming the first European woman to receive an American pilot's license.

She was in the White Squadron medical wing during battles on the Eastern Front in World War II, remaining active until 12 May 1945. She owned two biplanes.

Later life
After World War II, she signed a document condemning the November 1946 election, and was sent to prison for two years. It is believed she died on 2 February 1948, and is possibly buried in the Central Cemetery in Cluj, under the name of Maria Popescu.

Legacy
A street in Bucharest and the 53rd Commando Battalion of the 6th Special Operations Brigade are named after her.

(Substantial parts of this article were taken from selected sentences from automatic translations from the Romanian Wiki, and from the Avram reference.)

References

External links

  Dr. Valeriu Avram, Smaranda Brăescu,o pasăre în văzduh (Smaranda Brăescu, A Bird in the Sky), in Magazin istoric, January 2001
  Costin Anghel, Smaranda Brăescu, eroina (Smaranda Brăescu, the Heroine) , in Jurnalul Național, 10 April 2005

1897 births
1948 deaths
People from Galați County
Romanian aviators
Romanian schoolteachers
Romanian skydivers
Romanian women aviators
Women aviation record holders
Romanian military personnel of World War II
Romanian dissidents
Romanian people who died in prison custody
Prisoners who died in Romanian detention